Aiman Umarova (born Zhambyl province, Kazakhstan) is a Kazakh human rights lawyer. She won an International Women of Courage Award in 2018.

Life 
She is a defense attorney and member of the Almaty Regional Bar Association.

She represented the Presidential candidate Vladimir Kozlov.

She works to rehabilitate women connected with extremist groups.

References

External links 

 
 

Living people
People from Jambyl Region
Kazakhstani lawyers
Women lawyers
Kazakhstani human rights activists
Kazakhstani women activists
Year of birth missing (living people)
Recipients of the International Women of Courage Award